Mairie de Montreuil is a station on line 9 of the Paris Métro. It is named after the nearby Mairie de Montreuil (Montreuil town hall).

History 
The station opened on 14 October 1937 with the extension of the line from Porte de Montreuil and serves as the eastern terminus of line 9.

In 2019, the station was used by 8,106,589 passengers, making it the 27th busiest of the Métro network out of 302 stations.

In 2020, the station was used by 4,764,601 passengers amidst the COVID-19 pandemic, making it the 18th busiest of the Métro network out of 305 stations.

Passenger services

Access 
The station has 5 accesses:

 Access 1: Square Jean-Jaurès
 Access 2: avenue Walwein
 Access 3: Boulevard Rouget-de-Lisle
 Access 4: avenue Pasteur
 Access 5: Boulevard Paul-Vaillant-Couturier

Station layout

Platforms 
The station has a standard configuration with 2 tracks surrounded by 2 side platforms.

Other connections 
The station is also served by lines 102, 115, 121, 122, 129, and 322 of the RATP bus network, and at night, by lines N16 and N34 of the Noctilien bus network.

Gallery

References

Roland, Gérard (2003). Stations de métro. D’Abbesses à Wagram. Éditions Bonneton.

Paris Métro line 9
Paris Métro stations in Montreuil, Seine-Saint-Denis
Railway stations in France opened in 1937